The 2011 San Jose Earthquakes season was the club's 14th year of existence, as well as its 14th season in Major League Soccer and its fourth consecutive season in the top-flight of American soccer. This is the 29th season of a club bearing the "Earthquakes" name.

Squad 
As of September 15, 2011.

Reserves 
This list shows players who have played for the team in official 2011 MLS Reserve Division games, but are not part of the senior roster.

Management

Other information

Transfers

In

Out

Loans in

Loans out

Released

Friendlies

Competitions

Major League Soccer

Regular season

League table

Conference

Overall

Results summary

Results by matchday

Results

U.S. Open Cup

Qualification

Squad statistics

Appearances and goals

|-
|colspan="14"|Players away from San Jose Earthquakes on loan:
|-
|colspan="14"|Players who left San Jose Earthquakes during the season:

|}

Goal scorers

Disciplinary record

Miscellany

Allocation ranking 
San Jose is in the #9 position in the MLS Allocation Ranking. The allocation ranking is the mechanism used to determine which MLS club has first priority to acquire a U.S. National Team player who signs with MLS after playing abroad, or a former MLS player who returns to the league after having gone to a club abroad for a transfer fee. A ranking can be traded, provided that part of the compensation received in return is another club's ranking.

International roster spots 
San Jose has six international roster spots. Each club in Major League Soccer is allocated 8 international roster spots, which can be traded. On 14 July 2011, San Jose traded a slot to Toronto FC for use through the 2012 season, at which time the slot reverts to San Jose.

Previously, the club dealt one spot to Toronto FC on 14 July 2008 which was to remain with Toronto through the 2013 season then revert to San Jose. The club also dealt one spot to New York on 2 March 2009 but press reports did not indicate if or when this roster spots would revert to San Jose. One of these two traded slots did revert to San Jose prior to the 2011 season.

The club also acquired one spot from Houston on 14 August 2009 but that spot reverted to the Dynamo after the 2010 season.

There is no limit on the number of international slots on each club's roster. The remaining roster slots must belong to domestic players. For clubs based in the United States, a domestic player is either a U.S. citizen, a permanent resident (green card holder) or the holder of other special status (e.g., refugee or asylum status).

Future draft pick trades 
Future picks acquired: 2012 SuperDraft Round 2 pick acquired from Colorado Rapids.
Future picks traded: None.

MLS rights to other players 
San Jose maintains the MLS rights to Clarence Goodson after he declined a contract offer by the league and signed overseas with no transfer fee received. San Jose acquired Goodson's rights by drafting him in the 2007 MLS Expansion Draft.

References 

San Jose Earthquakes seasons
San Jose Earthquakes
San Jose Earthquakes
San Jose Earthquakes